Fox v R is a 2002 Judicial Committee of the Privy Council (JCPC) case in which it was held that it was unconstitutional in Saint Kitts and Nevis for capital punishment to be the mandatory sentence for murder. The JCPC held that because the Constitution of Saint Kitts and Nevis prohibits "inhuman or degrading punishment", following a murder conviction, a trial judge must have discretion to impose a lesser penalty than death by hanging; capital punishment may be applied only in those cases that contain aggravating factors as compared to other murder cases.

The case involved British bodybuilder Bertil Fox, who in 1998 was convicted of murdering his former fiancée and her mother the previous year. The case was decided with Reyes v R and R v Hughes, cases on the same issue on appeal from Belize and Saint Lucia.

See also
Bowe v R
Boyce v R
Matthew v S

External links
Fox v R, bailii.org

2002 in case law
2002 in Saint Kitts and Nevis
Death penalty case law
Judicial Committee of the Privy Council cases on appeal from Saint Kitts and Nevis
Prisoners sentenced to death by Saint Kitts and Nevis
Murder in Saint Kitts and Nevis